Heat shock protein 75 kDa, mitochondrial is a protein that in humans is encoded by the TRAP1 gene.

Interactions
TRAP1 has been shown to interact with EXT2, EXT1 and Retinoblastoma protein.

References

Further reading

External links